Pasheh Dan (also Romanized as Pasheh Dān; also known as Pīsheh Dān) is a village in Poshtkuh-e Rostam Rural District, Sorna District, Rostam County, Fars Province, Iran. At the 2006 census, its population was 20, in 5 families.

References 

Populated places in Rostam County